e-Administration, or electronic administration, refers to any of a number of mechanisms which convert what in a traditional office are paper processes into electronic processes, with the goal being to create a paperless office.  This is an ICT tool, with the goal being to improve productivity and performance.

e-Administration can encompass both intra-office and inter-office communication for any organization.

Its objective is to introduce total transparency and accountability leading to better e-Governance within any organization.  In Germany, this initiative is especially targeted at government organizations, where public accountability is of special concern.  Similar processes are being developed in many American corporations to aid compliance with the Sarbanes-Oxley Act.

The implementation of any e-administration solution should be customer centric rather than organization centric, should remove dependence on specific individuals, and should introduce transparent systems of working.  Examples of e-administration include, online timesheets and expense account. These can be used to help reduce costs to an organization.

See also
 e-government

External links
 World e-Gov Forum
 e-forum Association dedicated to analysing the future needs of eGovernment in Europe
 Internet Society Organization home for the groups responsible for Internet infrastructure standards, including the Internet Engineering Task Force (IETF) and the Internet Architecture Board (IAB).

Office work
Waste minimisation
Administrative software

ar:الحكومة الالكترونية
da:Digital forvaltning
el:Ηλεκτρονική Διακυβέρνηση
es:E-gobierno
fr:E-Gouvernement
it:E-government
he:ממשל אלקטרוני
nl:E-government
pl:E-Government
ru:Электронное государство